Brandy Wharf is a hamlet in the West Lindsey district of Lincolnshire, England, it is part of Waddingham parish . It is situated near and between Waddingham and South Kelsey, where the B1205 crosses the New River Ancholme.

The place name, Brandy Wharf, is modern and is first noticed on the Ordnance Survey map of 1824.

The bridge at Brandy Wharf was constructed in cast iron by engineer John Rennie in 1831.  The ribs were cast by The Butterley Company.

Brandy Wharf contains a leisure park and formerly a cider centre which closed in 2014 and is now a Private Residence. The cider centre was originally a cottage and the earliest record is its purchase by Magdalene Porter, who bought it from a yeoman farmer named John Atkinson in 1728. It passed through the hands of William Smith, John Hill and Ann Chapman. Thomas Atkinson bought it in about 1801 and named it the Anchor Inn; it was in the family for 69 years. After improvements to the River Ancholme, trade increased as did the population.

References

External links

Hamlets in Lincolnshire
Bridges in Lincolnshire
West Lindsey District